The National Academic Library of Kazakhstan is a national library specializing in academic publications. Built during the presidency of National Library of Kazakhstan, the structure resembles a Möbius strip.

See also
National Library of Kazakhstan

References

External links

Kazakhstan